Luo Heng (born 16 January 1993) is a Chinese footballer.

Club career
Luo Heng started his professional football career in 2013 when he was promoted to China League One side Henan Jianye's first team squad. He made his senior debut on 22 May 2013 in a 1–0 away defeat against Changchun Yatai in the 2013 Chinese FA Cup, coming on for Bi Jinhao in the 77th minute. Luo was loaned to China League Two side Jiangxi Liansheng in July 2013. He didn't appear for the Jiangxi throughout the entirety of his loan spell. He was then loaned to fellow League Two side Sichuan Leaders for one season in March 2014 after Henan won promotion to the first tier. He made his debut for the club on 30 March 2014 in a 1–0 away win against amateur team Qingdao Huanghai Zhiyao in the 2014 Chinese FA Cup. He returned to Henan in advance in the summer of 2014 and mostly played for Henan Jianye's reserve team in the 2015 and 2016 season. Luo eventually made his Super League debut on 15 April 2017 in a 1–1 home draw against Jiangsu Suning, coming on as a substitute for Abduwali Ablet in the 69th minute.

In March 2018, was then loaned to China League Two side Hebei Elite until 31 December 2018.

Career statistics
.

References

1993 births
Living people
Chinese footballers
People from Zhumadian
Footballers from Henan
Jiangxi Beidamen F.C. players
Henan Songshan Longmen F.C. players
Chinese Super League players
China League One players
China League Two players

Association football defenders